Montel Lamar Harris (born October 30, 1989) is American football running back. He played college football for the Boston College Eagles and Temple Owls.

Early years
Harris played Pop Warner football for the Normandy Cowboys, until his middle school years. Harris attended Trinity Christian Academy in Jacksonville, Florida along with tailback Jamie Harper. In high school, Harris gained 4,000 yards.

College career

Boston College Eagles
In Harris' freshman year, he combined with teammate Josh Haden to be the second-most prolific all-freshmen backfield in the country. With 900 rushing yards, Harris broke the school's freshman rushing record.

Sophomore year was a breakout year for Harris on the national stage. With 1,457 yards and 14 touchdowns, Harris was an All-ACC selection (Second Team) an SI.com All-American (honorable mention). On October 17, 2009, Harris broke the school's single game rushing records for yards and touchdowns, amassing 264 yards and 5 touchdowns in a victory over the NC State Wolfpack.

During his junior year, Harris gained 1,243 yards. Harris was injured in the Eagles second last regular season game against the Virginia Cavaliers. He missed the rest of the season after undergoing surgery. Harris was an All-ACC selection (First Team).

Heading into his senior year, Harris was named the Preseason ACC Player of the Year. Harris played in only two games; he missed the first three games of the season and re-injured his knee in a loss to Wake Forest. Prior to the injury, Harris broke the school's rushing record (previously held by Derrick Knight). The school announced that they would be seeking a medical redshirt for Harris, allowing him to play in 2012. On December 16, 2011, Harris' application for a medical redshirt was approved and Harris was scheduled to return to the Eagles in 2012.

As of 2011, Harris had gained 3,735 yards and 27 touchdowns on 787 carries.

On May 1, 2012, Harris was permanently dismissed from the Boston College football team due to a repeated violation of team rules.

Temple Owls
A fifth-year senior, Harris transferred to Temple in the fall of 2012 after receiving a medical red-shirt for his sixth and final year of eligibility. Harris had a successful final year running for 12 touchdowns and averaging 5.7 yards per carry.

Professional career
In 2013, Harris had a two week tryout with the Tampa Bay Buccaneers. He signed with the Hamilton Tiger-Cats on May 29, 2013 but was released two days later.

References

External links
Temple Owls  bio
Boston College Eagles bio

1989 births
Living people
Players of American football from Jacksonville, Florida
American football running backs
Boston College Eagles football players
Temple Owls football players